Adriana Gabriela Riveramelo Quintana (born 24 December 1970), known professionally as Adriana Riveramelo, is a Mexican journalist, presenter, television actress and singer. She studied at the Artistic Education Center of Televisa and since 1994 has hosted various television programs and awards ceremonies.

Biography
Adriana Riveramelo began her career as a singer at age 16, joining a musical group in 1988 and six years later was hired by TV Azteca as a reporter for programs like Ciudad Desnuda. Riveramelo entered acting in 1999, appearing on the Mexican telenovela Siempre te amaré with such actors as Laura Flores and Fernando Carrillo. She has hosted TV shows such as Hoy Sábado, El Club and Dilo, and dilo VIP and awards for Televisa like El Heraldo de México, the Premios Eres, and Premios TVyNovelas. Since 2007, Riveramelo is the host of s news and entertainment sections, sharing every news broadcast with Esteban Arce and Ulises de la Torre.

Citations

External links 
Profile at IMDb

1970 births
Living people
Actresses from Mexico City
Mexican television presenters
Mexican women journalists
Mexican women television presenters